Cordyceps , or Dongchong Xiacao (Traditional Chinese: 冬蟲夏草, literally "winter bug summer herb"), is a genus of ascomycete fungi (sac fungi) that includes about 600 worldwide species. Diverse variants of cordyceps have had more than 1,500 years of use in  Chinese medicine. Most Cordyceps species are endoparasitoids, parasitic mainly on insects and other arthropods (they are thus entomopathogenic fungi); a few are parasitic on other fungi.  

The generic name Cordyceps is derived from the Ancient Greek word κορδύλη kordýlē, meaning "club", and the Latin suffix -ceps, meaning "-headed". Currently, the genus has a worldwide distribution and most of the approximately 600 species that have been described are from Asia (notably Nepal, China, Japan, Bhutan, Korea, Vietnam, and Thailand).

Subtaxa
There are two recognized subgenera:
Cordyceps subgen. Cordyceps Fr. 1818
Cordyceps subgen. Cordylia Tul. & C. Tul. 1865
Cordyceps subgen. Epichloe was at one time a subgenus, but is now regarded as a separate genus, Epichloë.

C. sinensis was shown in 2007 by nuclear DNA sampling to be distantly related to most of the remainder of species then placed in that genus, and as a result it was renamed Ophiocordyceps sinensis and placed in a new family, the Ophiocordycipitaceae, as was "Cordyceps unilateralis".

Cordyceps and Metacordyceps spp. are now thought to be the teleomorphs of a number of anamorphic, entomopathogenic fungus "genera" such as: Beauveria (Cordyceps bassiana), Lecanicillium, Metarhizium and Nomuraea.

Biology
When Cordyceps attacks a host, the mycelium invades and eventually replaces the host tissue, while the elongated fruit body (ascocarp) may be cylindrical, branched, or of complex shape. The ascocarp bears many small, flask-shaped perithecia containing asci. These, in turn, contain thread-like ascospores, which usually break into fragments and are presumably infective.

Research

Polysaccharide components and cordycepin are under basic research and have been isolated from C. militaris.

In popular culture
Cordyceps has long been used in traditional Chinese medicine to treat many diseases related to lungs and kidneys. It is believed to treat coughs and improve the immune system. It is also used as an aphrodisiac (to promote male sexual potency) and treatment for ailments such as chronic fatigue syndrome and to alleviate fatigue caused by cancer.

Cordyceps is a core plot element in the video game series The Last of Us, first released in 2013, and its 2023 television adaptation.. It is also the cause of the worldwide epidemic that wipes out most of humanity in ML Carey’s postapocalyptic novel The Girl with All the Gifts and its prequel The Boy on the Bridge.

In the video game Bug Fables: The Everlasting Sapling, Cordyceps-infected bugs are enemies that can be encountered. Cordyceps also serves as a major plot point in the story.

Gallery

See also
 Medicinal fungi

References

 
Edible fungi
Parasitic fungi
Sordariomycetes genera
Taxa named by Elias Magnus Fries
Taxa described in 1818